Elio Ragni (5 December 1910 – 20 June 1998) was an Italian athlete who competed mainly in the 100 metres.

Biography
He competed for Italy in the 1936 Summer Olympics held in Berlin, Germany in the 4 x 100 metre relay where he won the silver medal with his team mates Orazio Mariani, Gianni Caldana and Tullio Gonnelli.

Olympic results

See also
 Italy national relay team

References

External links
 
 

1910 births
1998 deaths
Athletes from Milan
Athletes (track and field) at the 1936 Summer Olympics
Italian male sprinters
Olympic athletes of Italy
Olympic silver medalists for Italy
Medalists at the 1936 Summer Olympics
Olympic silver medalists in athletics (track and field)